Svedberg is a Swedish surname. Notable people with the surname include:

Annakarin Svedberg (born 1934), Swedish writer
Gunnar Svedberg (born 1947), Swedish chemist and academic
Hans Svedberg (1931–2012), Swedish ice hockey player
Hillevi Svedberg (1910–1990), Swedish architect
Johan Svedberg (born 1980), Swedish ice hockey player
Jonathan Svedberg (born 1999), Swedish footballer
Lena Svedberg (1946–1972), Swedish artist
Lennart Svedberg (1944–1972), Swedish ice hockey player
Niklas Svedberg (born 1989), Swedish ice hockey player
Per Svedberg (born 1965), Swedish politician
Rudolf Svedberg (1910–1992), Swedish sport wrestler
Ruth Svedberg (1903–2002), Swedish track and field athlete
Theodor Svedberg (1884–1971), Swedish chemist
Viktor Svedberg (born 1991), Swedish ice hockey player
William Svedberg (born 1992), Swedish actor

Swedish-language surnames